The elm cultivar Ulmus × hollandica 'Loke' is one of five miniature or bonsai cultivars from the Elegantissima group raised by the Gartneriet Vestdal nursery in Odense, Denmark.

Description
'Loke' is distinguished by its lime yellow foliage, compact growth, and propensity to develop side shoots.

Nurseries

Europe
Gartneriet Vestdal, Odense, Denmark.
Tibidao AB, Sweden.

References

Dutch elm cultivar
Ulmus articles missing images
Ulmus